Wrestlingworth and Cockayne Hatley is a civil parish in Bedfordshire, England. It was formed when the ancient parishes of Wrestlingworth and Cockayne Hatley were amalgamated in 1985.

References

Civil parishes in Bedfordshire
Central Bedfordshire District